Elisa is a compilation album by Italian singer Elisa released in 2002.

Track listing
All lyrics written by Elisa except where noted; all music composed by Elisa except where noted.

2002 compilation albums
Elisa (Italian singer) compilation albums